John Gibbons (8 January 1774 – 26 March 1844) was an English amateur cricketer who made 12 known appearances in first-class cricket matches between 1797 and 1801.

Gibbons was a member of Marylebone Cricket Club (MCC) and played most of his top-class cricket for sides associated with the club.

References

1774 births
1844 deaths
English cricketers
English cricketers of 1787 to 1825
Marylebone Cricket Club cricketers
People from Stanwell
Surrey and Marylebone Cricket Club cricketers
Lord Yarmouth's XI cricketers
Colonel C. Lennox's XI cricketers